Reus Airport  is located by the beaches of Costa Daurada, equidistant in relation to the town of Constantí and the city of Reus and approximately  from the city centre of Tarragona, in Catalonia, Spain. It is also close to one of Europe's largest theme resorts, PortAventura World, and the Mountains of Prades, a Mediterranean forest in the comarca of Baix Camp.

History

Early years
The airport was founded in 1935 by the Aeroclub de Reus. It served as a Republican base during the Spanish Civil War and after the fascist victory served as a Spanish Air Force base.  The base was demilitarised in the late 1990s and became a fully civilian airport administered by AENA, the Spanish airports authority.

Development since the 2000s
The airport has been a Ryanair base since October 2008 although for the winter 2009–2010 season Ryanair reduced the number of flights and destinations from Reus by a substantial amount. This reduction was only temporary for the winter months, and a full flight programme recommenced late March 2010.

On 29 June 2011 Ryanair announced that their base would close on 30 October with the loss of 28 routes after failing to reach an agreement with the local government. Ryanair resumed some flights in March 2012, but they are operated by aircraft not based at Reus.

Terminal

In order to adapt Reus Airport to future air traffic demand, Aena Aeropuertos has carried out a series of improvements and extended its facilities.  These include a new check-in building between the arrivals and departures buildings, integrating the three buildings into one.  The departures building has also been remodelled for use as a boarding area. The new departures terminal has 23 check-in desks and 12 boarding gates spread over two rooms: gates 1 to 6 are intended for non-Schengen flights, and 7 to 12 are dedicated to Schengen destinations. The public area and the passenger only zone have cafeteria and restaurant services and duty-free shops.

Airlines and destinations
The following airlines operate regular scheduled and charter flights to and from Reus:

Statistics
In 1995, approximately 500,000 passengers passed through the airport. In 2004 this number more than doubled to 1.1 million and in 2009 the airport reached a peak of 1.7 million. By 2014 this had dropped (-12.4%) to 850,492 passengers. In 2015 the drop continued to 705,067 passengers (-17,1%). After that the number of passengers has increased a lot to 817,765 passengers in 2016 (+16,0%). In 2017 the airport passed after 6 years again the mark of 1 million passengers.

Incidents and accidents
 On 20 July 1970, a Condor Boeing 737-100 (registered D-ABEL) which was approaching Reus Airport, collided with a privately owned Piper Cherokee light aircraft (registration EC-BRU) near Tarragona, Spain. The Piper subsequently crashed, resulting in the death of the three persons on board. The Condor Boeing suffered only minor damage, and there were no injuries amongst the 95 passengers and 5 crew members.
 In 1996, two powerful bombs placed by the Basque group Euskadi ta Askatasuna (ETA) in the airport left more than 30 people injured. That same day two other bombs exploded in two hotels located near the airport.
 In 2004 a Swearingen Metro aircraft was to be repositioned to Barcelona Airport for maintenance work, but during takeoff, while accelerating 80 knots, the nose gear collapsed. The aircraft sustained serious damage to the fuselage, engines and the propellers.

References

External links

 Official website

Airports in Catalonia
Province of Tarragona
Airports established in 1935